Morten Østergaard (born 17 June 1976 in Aarhus) is a Danish politician who served as Denmark's Minister for Economic and Interior Affairs from 2 September 2014 to 28 June 2015. Leader of the Danish Social Liberal Party from September 2014 to October 2020, he was a member of the Folketing from 2005 to 2021. He was furthermore Minister for Research, Innovation and Higher Education from 2011 to 2014 and for a short term in 2014 also Minister for Taxation.

Background
He holds a master's degree in political science from the University of Aarhus.

Political career
Østergaard was vice-chairman of the party from 2002 to 2005 and has been a member of parliament since the 2005 election.

Following the announcement on 31 August 2014 that Margrethe Vestager is to become Denmark's EU Commissioner, Østergaard was elected leader of the Danish Social Liberal Party and was appointed Deputy Prime Minister of Denmark, as well as Minister of the Interior. On October 7, 2020, Østergaard resigned as the leader of the Danish Social Liberal Party due to inappropriate sexual behaviour towards fellow Social Liberal MP Lotte Rod.

References

External links

 

1976 births
Living people
People from Aarhus
Danish Social Liberal Party politicians
Government ministers of Denmark
Aarhus University alumni
Danish Tax Ministers
Members of the Folketing 2005–2007
Members of the Folketing 2007–2011
Members of the Folketing 2011–2015
Members of the Folketing 2015–2019
Members of the Folketing 2019–2022
Leaders of the Danish Social Liberal Party